Palermo is a town and municipality in the Huila Department, Colombia. This town was previously named Guagua.

Culture

Notable people from Palermo

 Manuel de Jesús Andrade Suárez (1860–1935) writer, journalist and politician.

Twin Cities

  Palermo, Italy

References

Municipalities of Huila Department